Sir Nathaniel Dance-Holland, 1st Baronet  (8 May 1735 – 15 October 1811) was an English painter and politician.

Early life
The third son of architect George Dance the Elder, Dance (he added the 'Holland' suffix later in life) studied art under Francis Hayman, and like many contemporaries also studied in Italy. There he met Angelica Kauffman, and painted several historic and classical paintings.

Career
On his return to England, he became a successful portrait painter. With Hayman and his architect brother, George, he was one of the founder members of the Royal Academy in 1768.

He was commissioned to paint King George III and his queen, plus Captain James Cook and actor David Garrick. His group portrait The Pybus Family (1769) is in the collection of the National Gallery of Victoria, Melbourne, Australia.

In 1790, he gave up his artistic career and became Member of Parliament for East Grinstead in Sussex. He served this seat until 1802 when he moved to Great Bedwyn in Wiltshire, serving until 1806. 

In 1807 he returned to East Grinstead, serving until his death in 1811. He was made a baronet in 1800, which became extinct upon his death.

Family
He was married to Harriet, the daughter of Sir Cecil Bishopp, 6th Baronet and the widow of Thomas Dummer (died 1781), for whom his brother had designed the house at Cranbury Park, near Winchester. They lived at Little Wittenham Manor in Berkshire (now Oxfordshire). His wife survived him until 1825.

His nephew, Sir Nathaniel Dance (1748–1827), was a well-known commander of British East India Company ships.

Notes

References

External links 
 
 

1735 births
1811 deaths
Members of the Parliament of Great Britain for English constituencies
Members of the Parliament of the United Kingdom for English constituencies
Dance-Holland, Nathaniel, 1st Baronet
18th-century English painters
English male painters
19th-century English painters
English portrait painters
Royal Academicians
UK MPs 1801–1802
UK MPs 1802–1806
UK MPs 1807–1812
British MPs 1790–1796
British MPs 1796–1800
People from Little Wittenham
Sibling artists
19th-century English male artists
18th-century English male artists